Eugent Bushpepa (born 2 July 1984), also known by his alternative name Gent Bushpepa, is an Albanian singer, songwriter and composer. Regarded as one of the most popular modern rock musicians in the Albanian-speaking world, he is noted for his vocal range, vocal power, high-energy live performances, and is also recognised as an accomplished guitarist.

Bushpepa and his band were the supporting acts on the concert tours of Deep Purple in 2007, Duff Mckagan (Guns N' Roses) in 2011 and Overkill in 2014. On 18 August 2013, he performed a full concert with Ron "Bumblefoot" Thal. Bushpepa is the sole author of his song which was reworked for the Eurovision by Jim Lowe, a Grammy Award-winning British record producer and audio engineer.

In 2017, Bushpepa won the 56th edition of Festivali i Këngës with the song "Mall" and went on to represent Albania in the Eurovision Song Contest 2018 in Lisbon. He reached eleventh place in the grand final in a field of twenty-six and achieved the country's third highest placement to date.

Life and career 

Eugent Bushpepa was born on 2 July 1984 into an Albanian family of the Roman Catholic faith in the town of Rrëshen, then part of the People's Republic of Albania, present Albania. He started singing at the age of six while his guitar training began in the fifth grade of primary school. After finishing high school, he moved to Bologna, Italy, to study medicine where he completed his first academic year.

Bushpepa's professional career began in 2006 and since then he has been active in the Albanian music scene. His national breakthrough came with the song "Maska e Madhështisë", released in 2007 at Top Fest 4. In the same competition, he also teamed up with a rock band called Sunrise, performing their song Engjëll, and then he went on to play in major music festivals and worked on new music. Although Eugent made his professional stage debut in Kënga Magjike at the age of fourteen, his music career was jump-started upon his return to Albania in 2006 where he was set to pursue a medical degree in dentistry and started to perform live shows in various night clubs and pubs alongside studies. Writing and performing his own material, Bushpepa had also made various live covers and appeared in over 2000 live shows since his beginnings.

He was asked to become the supporting act for Duff McKagan for a concert in Tirana on their Loaded band tour on 1 June 2011. During a traditional beer festival in Korçë on 18 August 2013, Bushpepa performed with Ron "Bumblefoot" Thal, the guitarist of Guns N' Roses. In 2014, he joined the band Darkology as their tour vocalist., replacing Kelly Sundown Carpenter in their Killfest tour with Overkill, Prong, and Enforcer who performed in various cities in Spain, Portugal, Italy, Switzerland, Germany, and the  Netherlands.

In early to mid 2017, Bushpepa had signed on as an adviser in The Voice of Albania, assisting Besa's team, whereas on 24 December 2017, he won the 56th edition of Festivali i Këngës, the longest-running annual televised music competition in Albania since 1962, and thus represented Albania at the Eurovision Song Contest 2018 in Lisbon, Portugal with his song "Mall".

In December 2017, Radio Televizioni Shqiptar (RTSH) announced him as the Albanian representative for the Eurovision Song Contest 2018 in Lisbon, Portugal, after he won the 56th edition of Festivali i Këngës with his song "Mall".

The Eurovision version was reworked by Bushpepa and Jim Lowe, a Grammy Award-winning audio engineer, and was released through Universal Music on 16 April. Bushpepa's promotional tour in London and Tel Aviv were postponed due to visa delays, but he resumed the tour in Amsterdam and Madrid that advanced with great success. Albania was drawn to compete third at the first-semi final in which Bushpepa performed "Mall" third in a field of nineteen participants and qualified for the Grand Final being among the top ten most-voted acts. In the final, the song was performed twelfth in a field of twenty-six and ranked seventh with the juries and eleventh with a combined televote score.

Discography 

Bushpepa has released no album to date; though he deems himself as a "non-commercial artist" and stated that he is working on his debut album following requests from his fans.

Singles

As lead artist

Awards 

Top Fest

|-
|rowspan="1"|2008
|rowspan="1"|"Ëndërr reale"
|Best Male Singer
|
|-
|rowspan="1"|2009
|rowspan="1"|"Stinë dreqi"
|Vodafone Club Award
|
|-
|rowspan="1"|2011
|rowspan="1"|"Rebel pa hije"
|Best Male Singer
|
|-
|rowspan="1"|2015
|rowspan="1"|"Pranë finishit"
|Honorific Award
|
|}

See also 
Festivali i Këngës 56
Albania in the Eurovision Song Contest 2018

References

External links

1984 births
21st-century Albanian male singers
Albanian composers
Albanian guitarists
Albanian operatic tenors
Albanian rock singers
Albanian Roman Catholics
Albanian songwriters
Eurovision Song Contest entrants for Albania
Eurovision Song Contest entrants of 2018
Festivali i Këngës winners
Living people
People from Rrëshen